Gisela (minor planet designation: 352 Gisela) is an asteroid belonging to the Flora family in the Main Belt that has an unusually high albedo.

It was discovered by Max Wolf on 12 January 1893 in Heidelberg.

References

External links 
 
 

000352
Discoveries by Max Wolf
Named minor planets
000352
000352
18930112